This was the first edition of the tournament since 2011.

Flavio Cipolla and Daniel Muñoz de la Nava won the tournament, defeating Gero Kretschmer and Alexander Satschko in the final.

Seeds

Draw

References
 Main Draw

Antonio Savoldi-Marco Co - Trofeo Dimmidisi - Doubles
Antonio Savoldi–Marco Cò – Trofeo Dimmidisì